Momentum is the sixth studio album by Jamie Cullum. It was released on 20 May 2013 by Island Records and is produced by Dan the Automator and Jim Abbiss. The album includes covers of "Love for Sale" (which he had earlier recorded for his independent album Heard It All Before) and Anthony Newley's "Pure Imagination". The song "You're Not the Only One" was written about Cullum's experience serving as a judge on the television reality series Must Be the Music.

Track listing

Charts

Weekly charts

Year-end charts

References

2013 albums
Jamie Cullum albums
Island Records albums
Albums produced by Dan the Automator
Albums produced by Jim Abbiss
Crossover jazz albums